Great Esker Park is located in Weymouth, Massachusetts.  The park mostly consists of a geological formation known as an esker (a winding ridge of stratified sand and gravel) formed by a glacier 12,000 years ago.  It is located along the Weymouth Back River, across from Bare Cove Park in Hingham, Massachusetts. 

The park features the highest esker in North America (90 ft), reversing falls, salt marshes, six miles (10 km) of trails, a playground and picnic area. Bird watching is a popular activity as osprey, great blue heron, red-tailed hawks, owls, and other species of birds are abundant seasonally. There are man-made shelters on the river where Osprey nest in the spring and summer months.

In the summer months the park is used by Wey-Rec for children's programs.

Image gallery

See also
 Weymouth Back River

References

External links
 Weymouth Back River Reservation map 
 Weymouth's Great Esker park, an interesting geological formation along the Back River 
 Great Esker Park in Weymouth
 Back River Bob-Obituary

Hiking trails in Massachusetts
Parks in Norfolk County, Massachusetts
Weymouth, Massachusetts